Tyche (minor planet designation: 258 Tyche) is a relatively large main belt asteroid discovered by Robert Luther at Düsseldorf-Bilk Observatory on 4 May 1886. The stony S-type asteroid measures about 65 kilometers in diameter and has a perihelion of 2.1 AU.

Tyche orbits very close to the Eunomia family of asteroids, and could be a member based on composition. However, it is larger than all family members apart from 15 Eunomia while lying at the very edge of the family group. Hence, there is a good chance that it is an unrelated interloper.

There is some uncertainty regarding Tyche's rotation period. Various authors give values from 9.983 to 10.041 hours.

It was named after Greek goddess of fortune, Tyche, which is also the name of one of the Oceanids. Tyche's Roman equivalent is Fortuna, after which the asteroid 19 Fortuna is named.

References

External links 
 
 The Asteroid Orbital Elements Database
 Minor Planet Discovery Circumstances
 Asteroid Lightcurve Data File
 Ephemeris
 
 

Eunomia asteroids
Background asteroids
Tyche
Tyche
S-type asteroids (Tholen)
S-type asteroids (SMASS)
18860504